Radian Aerospace is an American aerospace company based in Renton, Washington. The company is developing a single-stage to orbit spaceplane concept called Radian One.

History 
Radian was founded in 2016. In January 2022, the company closed a $27.5 million seed round led by venture capital fund Fine Structure Ventures.

Company 
Radian is linked with Holder Aerospace, another Renton-based engineering company headed by former astronaut Livingston Holder and aerospace executive Curtis Gifford.

Design 
Radian is developing their rocket engine in Renton and at a testing facility near Bremerton, Washington. The delta-winged plane will be launched from a rocket-powered sled. Once on orbit, the vehicle can deliver payloads or crew to low earth orbit. Radian One is expected to land on any  runway and fly again in 48 hours.

Target markets 
The company is focusing on research, space manufacturing, terrestrial observation, and rapid global delivery to Earth destinations. Radian penned launch agreements with governments and commercial firms.

See also 

 Dream Chaser
 Skylon (spacecraft)
 PD AeroSpace
 Relativity Space
 Isar Aerospace
 Rocket Factory Augsburg AG
 Vector Launch
 Orbex
 Skyrora
 PLD Space

References

External links 
 Official Website

Aerospace companies of the United States
Private spaceflight companies
Companies based in Seattle